The Ammiraglio di Saint Bon class was a pair of pre-dreadnought battleships built for the Italian Navy during the 1890s. Smaller and less powerfully-armed than most contemporary battleships, they marked a brief departure from Italian capital ship design, which had previously emphasized large ships equipped with large guns.

Both ships served in the active duty squadron early in their careers, and participated in the Italo-Turkish War of 1911–1912. They took part in the Italian offensives in North Africa and the island of Rhodes, but did not see combat with the Ottoman fleet. They were reduced to harbor defense ships by the outbreak of World War I, and they spent the war in Venice. The ships were discarded shortly after the end of the war, both having been stricken in 1920.

Design
Since the planners had not determined what type of battleship would best suit their strategic needs, the government stepped in and mandated a  design, a limit significantly lower than the earlier classes. Following the death of di Saint Bon, Brin took over the design process and proposed a small battleship armed with  guns, a weaker main battery than those of contemporary foreign designs.

The ships, much smaller than their contemporaries, and slower than cruisers, were not particularly useful warships. The mistake of building a battleship of only 10,000 tons was not repeated in the subsequent, and much more successful, .

General characteristics and machinery

The ships had an inverted bow and a relatively low freeboard of only . They had a fairly large superstructure with a conning tower and high bridge forward and a large military mast fitted with fighting tops placed amidships. Abreast the mast, each ship carried a number of small boats. Ammiraglio di Saint Bon had a crew of 557 officers and enlisted men, while Emanuele Filiberto had a slightly larger complement of 565.

The ships' propulsion system consisted of two triple-expansion steam engines, which drove a pair of screw propellers. Steam for the engines was provided by twelve coal-fired cylindrical fire-tube boilers, which were ducted into a pair of widely spaced funnels.

Armament and armor
The ships were armed with a main battery of four  40-caliber guns manufactured by Armstrong Whitworth. The guns were placed in two twin gun turrets, one forward and one aft. The ships were also equipped with a secondary battery of eight  40-cal. guns in individual casemates amidships. These guns were export derivatives of the British QF 6-inch /40 gun. Ammiraglio di Saint Bon was also equipped with eight  40-cal. guns in shielded pivot mounts directly above the casemate battery, while Ammiraglio di Saint Bon carried six  guns. Close-range defense against torpedo boats was provided by a battery of eight  guns and two  guns. Emanuele Filiberto had eight  guns instead. Both ships also carried four  torpedo tubes in deck-mounted launchers.

The ships were protected with Harvey steel. The conning tower was protected by 249 mm of armor plating on the sides.

Ships of the class

Service

 was built by the Venetian Arsenal in Venice. She was laid down on 18 July 1893, launched on 29 April 1897, and completed on 24 May 1901, although she had been commissioned on 1 February 1901.  was named after Prince Emanuele Filiberto, Duke of Aosta. She was laid down on 5 October 1893, launched on 29 September 1897, and completed on 16 April 1902, although she had been commissioned on 6 September 1901. The ships spend the first several years in the active duty squadron until they were replaced by the new s, which entered service by 1908.

Both ships took part in the Italo-Turkish War in 1911–1912 in the 3rd Division with the two Regina Margherita-class battleships. Emanuele Filiberto took part in the attack on Tripoli in October 1911, though Ammiraglio di Saint Bon did not see action in the first months of the war. Both ships participated in the seizure of the island of Rhodes, where Ammiraglio di Saint Bon provided gunfire support to the soldiers ashore.

The two ships were slated to be scrapped in 1914–1915 due to their age, but the outbreak of World War I in August 1914 prevented their disposal. Italy initially remained neutral during the war, but by 1915, had been convinced by the Triple Entente to enter the war against Germany and Austria-Hungary. Both Ammiraglio di Saint Bon and Emanuele Filiberto were used as harbor defense ships in Venice for the duration of the war, and did not see action there. Neither ship remained in service long after the end of the war. Emanuele Filiberto was stricken from the naval register on 29 March 1920 and Ammiraglio di Saint Bon was stricken on 18 June. Both ships were subsequently discarded.

Footnotes

References

Further reading

External links

 Ammiraglio di Saint Bon (1897) Marina Militare website